Daviesia pubigera is a species of flowering plant in the family Fabaceae and is endemic to New South Wales. It is an open to spreading shrub with sharply-pointed, narrowly egg-shaped phyllodes, and yellow and red flowers.

Description

Taxonomy and naming
Daviesia pubigera was first formally described in 1837 by George Bentham from an unpublished manuscript by Allan Cunningham. Bentham's description was published in his Commentationes de Leguminosarum Generibus. The specific epithet (pubigera) means "bearing soft hairs".

Distribution and habitat
This bitter-pea grows in on low hills and steep rocky slopes in open forest and heath mainly on the western slopes of New South Wales from the Queensland border to near Boorowa.

References

pubigera
Flora of New South Wales
Plants described in 1837
Taxa named by George Bentham